Samsung Galaxy Store (marketed as Galaxy Store; formerly known as Samsung Apps and Galaxy Apps) is an app store used for devices manufactured by Samsung Electronics that was launched in September 2009.

The service is primarily supplied pre-installed on Samsung Galaxy smartphones, Samsung Gear, and feature phones (such as the Samsung REX and Duos).

The store is available in 125 countries, and it offers apps for Android, Tizen, Windows Mobile, and Bada platforms. Apps from this store are updated by notifying the user via the Samsung Push Service, which has been installed in over one billion smartphones over the years.

Ratings system

The Samsung Galaxy Store has a rating system used to determine what app is okay for a child.

Samsung apps provided
Booking.com
The Weather Channel
Yelp
Device Assistance
Samsung Archive
Calendar
Samsung Cloud (till 2021)
Samsung Gallery
Samsung Gear
Fit Manager
Samsung Health
Samsung Internet
Samsung Keyboard
My Knox
Samsung Level
Samsung Link
Quick Measure
Samsung Messages
Samsung Music
Samsung My Files
Samsung Notes
Samsung Pay
Samsung Smart Home
Samsung Smart Switch
Galaxy View Remote
Samsung Video Library
Samsung Voice Recorder
Samsung Game Plugins

See also 

 List of Android app stores
 App store
 List of mobile app distribution platforms

References

 
Mobile software distribution platforms
Android (operating system) software
Bada software
2009 software